ADP-ribosylation factor-binding protein GGA3 is a protein that in humans is encoded by the GGA3 gene.

This gene encodes a member of the Golgi-localized, gamma adaptin ear-containing, ARF-binding (GGA) family. This family includes ubiquitous coat proteins that regulate the trafficking of proteins between the trans-Golgi network and the lysosome. These proteins share an amino-terminal VHS domain which mediates sorting of the mannose 6-phosphate receptors at the trans-Golgi network. They also contain a carboxy-terminal region with homology to the ear domain of gamma-adaptins. Alternative splicing of this gene results in two transcript variants.

Interactions 

GGA3 has been shown to interact with ARF1 and ARF3.

References

Further reading